Aaina may refer to:
Aaina (1944 film), an Indian Hindi language film directed by S. M. Yusuf starring Trilok Kapoor
Aaina (1977 film), an Indian Hindi language film directed by K. Balachander starring Rajesh Khanna
Aaina (1993 film), an Indian Hindi language film directed by Deepak Sareen starring Jackie Shroff, Amrita Singh and Juhi Chawla

See also
Aina (disambiguation)